The 2016 season was the Jacksonville Jaguars' 22nd in the National Football League (NFL), and their fourth and final season under head coach Gus Bradley, who was fired after the Week 15 game against the Houston Texans. The Jaguars missed the playoffs for the ninth consecutive season.

Roster changes

Notable transactions

Acquisitions
 FS Tashaun Gipson, signed on March 10, 2016.
 RB Chris Ivory, signed on March 10, 2016.
 DT Malik Jackson, signed on March 10, 2016.
 P Brad Nortman, signed on March 10, 2016.
 G Mackenzy Bernadeau, signed on March 11, 2016
 CB Prince Amukamara, signed on March 11, 2016
 OT Kelvin Beachum, signed on March 16, 2016
 QB Chad Henne, re-signed on February 18, 2016

Departures 
 G Zane Beadles (2014–2015), released on March 3, 2016.
 DE Chris Clemons (2014–2015), released on March 3, 2016.
 P Bryan Anger (2012–2015), declared free agent on March 9, 2016. 
 DE Andre Branch (2012–2015), declared free agent on March 9, 2016. 
 C Stefen Wisniewski (2015), declared free agent on March 9, 2016.
 RB Toby Gerhart (2014–2015), released on March 10, 2016.
 WR Damian Copeland (2014-2015), released on March 31, 2016.
LB Tyrone Holmes (2016), released on September 7, 2016.

Draft

Notes
 The Jaguars acquired an additional sixth-round selection in a trade that sent placekicker Josh Scobee to the Pittsburgh Steelers.
 The Jaguars traded their second- and fifth-round selections (38th and 146th) to Baltimore for its second-round selection (36th).

Staff

Final roster

Schedule
On November 25, 2015, the NFL announced that the Jaguars would play host to the Indianapolis Colts in the International Series at Wembley Stadium in London, England, in the fourth consecutive home game for the Jaguars in the International Series. The game occurred during Week 4 on Sunday, October 2, and was aired by CBS in the United States. The kickoff time was announced on April 14, with the Jaguars having their bye the following week. The remainder of the Jaguars' 2016 schedule, with exact dates and times, was finalized and announced on April 14.

Preseason

Regular season

Note: Intra-division opponents are in bold text.
 #  Blue/Red indicates the International Series game in London.

Game summaries

Week 1: vs. Green Bay Packers

Week 2: at San Diego Chargers

Week 3: vs. Baltimore Ravens

Week 4: vs. Indianapolis Colts
NFL International Series

Week 6: at Chicago Bears

Week 7: vs. Oakland Raiders

Week 8: at Tennessee Titans

Week 9: at Kansas City Chiefs

Week 10: vs. Houston Texans

Week 11: at Detroit Lions

Week 12: at Buffalo Bills

Week 13: vs. Denver Broncos

Week 14: vs. Minnesota Vikings

Week 15: at Houston Texans

Week 16: vs. Tennessee Titans

Week 17: at Indianapolis Colts

Standings

Division

Conference

References

External links
 

Jacksonville
Jacksonville Jaguars seasons
Jacksonville Jaguars